Bertrab Nunatak is a nunatak on the southern side of Lerchenfeld Glacier and about  west-south-west of the Littlewood Nunataks. It was discovered by the Second German Antarctic Expedition, 1911–12, under Wilhelm Filchner, who named this feature for General .

References 

Nunataks of Coats Land